Senator Roe may refer to:

Dudley Roe (1881–1970), Maryland State Senate
John B. Roe (born 1942), Illinois State Senate